Lady in the Fog is a 1952 British mystery film directed by Sam Newfield and starring Cesar Romero, Lois Maxwell and Bernadette O'Farrell. It is based on a BBC serial by Lester Powell as scripted by Orville H. Hampton, . It was made by Lippert Productions and Hammer Films at the Riverside Studios in Hammersmith. The film's sets were designed by the art director Wilfred Arnold. It was released in the United States by Lippert under the alternative title Scotland Yard Inspector.

Plot
In London an English woman asks for help from a visiting American writer to find out who has killed her brother.

Cast
 Cesar Romero as Philip 'Phil' O'Dell  
 Lois Maxwell as Margaret 'Peggy' Maybrick  
 Bernadette O'Farrell as Heather McMara  
 Geoffrey Keen as Christopher Hampden  
 Campbell Singer as Inspector Rigby  
 Alastair Hunter as Det. Sgt. Reilly  
 Mary Mackenzie as Marilyn Durant  
 Lloyd Lamble as Martin Sorrowby  
 Frank Birch as Boswell, the airport manager  
 Wensley Pithey as Sid, the bartender  
 Reed De Rouen as Connors, the thug  
 Peter Swanwick as Smithers  
 Bill Fraser as Sales Manager  
 Lionel Harris as Allan Mellon  
 Betty Cooper as Dr. Campbell, asylum superintendent
 Jean Bayliss as Delmont Switchboard Operator
 Dorinda Stevens as Girl at Film Studio (uncredited)

References

External links 
 

1952 films
1950s mystery films
British mystery films
Films directed by Sam Newfield
British detective films
Hammer Film Productions films
Films set in London
Lippert Pictures films
British black-and-white films
Films shot at Riverside Studios
1950s English-language films
1950s British films